Elizabeth Ann "Liz" Carruthers (born September 14, 1951) is a retired diver from Canada, who represented her native country at the 1972 Summer Olympics in Munich, West Germany. She won a total of two medals (one gold, one silver) at the Pan American Games (1971 and 1975). She won a silver medal at the 1970 British Commonwealth Games.

References
 Canadian Olympic Committee
 

1951 births
Living people
Canadian female divers
Commonwealth Games silver medallists for Canada
Divers at the 1970 British Commonwealth Games
Divers at the 1972 Summer Olympics
Olympic divers of Canada
Pan American Games gold medalists for Canada
Pan American Games silver medalists for Canada
Divers from Edmonton
Commonwealth Games medallists in diving
Pan American Games medalists in diving
Divers at the 1975 Pan American Games
Medalists at the 1975 Pan American Games
20th-century Canadian women
21st-century Canadian women
Medallists at the 1970 British Commonwealth Games